Fuller House is a historic home located at Louisburg, Franklin County, North Carolina.  It was built in 1856, and is a two-story, three bay by two bay, Greek Revival style frame dwelling.  It has a hipped roof and rests on a low foundation of stone blocks.  The front facade features a full width front porch. It was the home of noted poet and novelist Edwin Wiley Fuller (1847–1876).

It was listed on the National Register of Historic Places in 1978. It is located in the Louisburg Historic District.

Edwin Wilson Fuller
Fuller was born in Louisburg, North Carolina and wrote the novels The Angel in the Cloud (1873) and Sea-Gift (1871). A historical marker commemorating his life and work is four blocks east of the home. He married Elisabeth Malone and had two daughters before dying at 28.

References

Houses on the National Register of Historic Places in North Carolina
Houses completed in 1856
Greek Revival houses in North Carolina
Houses in Franklin County, North Carolina
National Register of Historic Places in Franklin County, North Carolina
Individually listed contributing properties to historic districts on the National Register in North Carolina